Santander Tower is a 50-story,  skyscraper at 1601 Elm Street adjacent to Thanks-Giving Square in downtown Dallas Texas. At its completion in 1982, it was the second tallest building in Dallas, surpassing Elm Place. One year later, with the completion of 1700 Pacific, it became the third tallest, and it is currently the 8th-tallest building in the city. The building is connected to the Dallas Pedestrian Network and the Bullington Truck Terminal. Santander Tower is owned and managed by Woods Capital, and it was designed by the architecture firm HKS Architects. Formerly known as the Thanks-Giving Tower, it was renamed in 2020 after Banco Santander.

In mid-2022 it was announced that 12 of the 50 floors will be converted into 228 residential units with building ownership citing post-pandemic housing demand and a weakened office market as the catalysts for the adaptive reuse project.

See also
 List of tallest buildings in Dallas

References

External links
 Thanksgiving Tower at Younan Properties

Office buildings in Dallas
Office buildings completed in 1982
Skyscrapers in Dallas